Kirschstein is a German surname meaning "cherry stone". It may refer to:

Hans Kirschstein (1896–1918), German fighter pilot
Leonore Kirschstein (1933–2017), German soprano
Ruth L. Kirschstein (1926–2009), U.S. pathologist and public health administrator
Sascha Kirschstein (born 1980), German footballer
Wilhelm Kirschstein (1863–1946), German schoolteacher and mycologist
Jean Kirschstein, a fictional character from the Attack on Titan series. also spelled as "Jean Kirstein".

German-language surnames

de:Kirschstein